Ronny Drayton (May 19, 1953 – February 7, 2020) was a guitarist based in the New York City area and Monroe, New York.

Born and raised in South Jamaica, Queens, New York City, Drayton started out playing drums at St. Clement The Pope Middle School and  switched to guitar at age 14. After high school, he eventually met and played with many notables in the genres of rock, funk, soul, blues and jazz, most notably R&B acts like The Persuaders and The Chambers Brothers. He became an in-demand session musician, performing with Edwin Birdsong and Nona Hendryx, and also studied Composition and Arrangement at Kingsborough Community College. Over the years, he has worked on countless recording projects as well as numerous TV shows and videos. In late 2012, Drayton joined 24-7 Spyz, performing with them as well as the bands Defunkt and Burnt Sugar the Arkestra Chamber until his death.

In 2012, Drayton was active in trying to get his son, Donovan Drayton, released from Riker's Island. In 2013, he contributed music to a benefit album to help recoup the legal fees involved in this fight.

On February 7, 2020, Drayton died of Non Hodgkins Lymphoma and treatment complications at the age of 66.

Partial discography
1973 - Edwin Birdsong - Super Natural
1982 - Material - One Down
1984 - David Sylvian - Brilliant Trees
1987 - Nona Hendryx - Female Trouble
1988 - Missing Links – Groovin1999 - Meshell Ndegeocello - Bitter
2013 - Various Artists - 4DonovanWith James Blood Ulmer'''
1981 - Free Lancing1981 - Black Rock1989 - Blues Allnight1990 - Black and Blues1992 - Blues Preacher''

References

1953 births
2020 deaths
People from Jamaica, Queens
2012 in music
Guitarists from New York (state)